Echinocereus pectinatus is a species of hedgehog cactus. It was first described by Engelmann in 1848. It is found in the south-western US (New Mexico and Texas) and northern Mexico (Chihuahua and Sonora).

Subspecies 
 Echinocereus pectinatus subsp. pectinatus
 Echinocereus pectinatus subsp. rutowiorum 
 Echinocereus pectinatus subsp. wenigeri

References

pectinatus
Plants described in 1848